Bắc Lý may refer to several places in Vietnam, including:

Bắc Lý, Quảng Bình, a ward of Đồng Hới
Bắc Lý, Bắc Giang, a commune of Hiệp Hòa District
Bắc Lý, Nghệ An, a commune of Kỳ Sơn District, Nghệ An Province
Bắc Lý, Hà Nam, a commune of Lý Nhân District